The Treznea is a left tributary of the river Agrij in Romania. It flows into the Agrij in Românași.

References

Rivers of Romania
Rivers of Sălaj County